The Simplyhealth Great Newham London Run is a  run around the Newham area, Olympic Park, and finishing across the line inside the Stadium at Queen Elizabeth Olympic Park. The run was established in 2015. It is one of the Great Run series of races.

Past winners
Key:

References

Sponsors and partners
 Newham Borough Council
 Virgin Trains
 Puma
 Lucozade Sport
 Aqua Pura

Sport in the London Borough of Newham
Sports competitions in London
Road running in the United Kingdom